is a Japanese otome game published by Red Entertainment. It was released in Japan on July 1, 2010, for the PlayStation 2. A fan disc titled Scared Rider Xechs: Stardust Lovers was released in 2011. The game was ported to the PlayStation Vita in 2015. A 12-episode anime television series adaptation by Satelight aired between July 5 and September 20, 2016.

Characters

Media

Anime
A 12-episode anime television series adaptation by Satelight aired between July 5 and September 20, 2016. The opening theme is  performed by Tatsuhisa Suzuki and Mamoru Miyano. The ending theme is "old revelation" performed by Kenn. Funimation streamed the series in North America and AnimeLab streamed the series in Australia.

References

External links
 

2010 video games
Anime television series based on video games
Funimation
Otome games
PlayStation 2 games
PlayStation Vita games
Red Entertainment games
Satelight
Video games developed in Japan